The 2008 NASCAR Camping World West Series was the 55th season of Camping World West Series, a regional stock car racing series sanctioned by NASCAR. It began with the Toyota/NAPA Auto Care 150 at All-American Speedway on March 29, 2008, and concluded with the Toyota/NAPA Auto Parts 150 by Thunder Valley, again at All-American Speedway, on October 25, 2008. Eric Holmes won the championship, 48 points in front of Jason Bowles. This was Holmes' second championship after his first came in 2006. He would go on to win a third championship in 2010, ironically meaning that he won a title every other year in this span of five years.

The 2008 season also was the first with Camping World as the title sponsor of the series, which replaced Anheuser-Busch's Busch Beer after 21 years.

Results

See also
 2008 NASCAR Sprint Cup Series
 2008 NASCAR Nationwide Series
 2008 NASCAR Craftsman Truck Series
 2008 ARCA Re/Max Series
 2008 NASCAR Camping World East Series
 2008 NASCAR Canadian Tire Series
 2008 NASCAR Corona Series

External links
 2008 NASCAR Camping World West Series Results

ARCA Menards Series West